Agonoleptus is a genus of ground beetles in the family Carabidae. There are about eight described species in Agonoleptus.

Species
These eight species belong to the genus Agonoleptus:
 Agonoleptus conjunctus (Say, 1823)
 Agonoleptus convexulus (Darlington, 1934)
 Agonoleptus dolosus (Casey, 1914)
 Agonoleptus parviceps Casey, 1914
 Agonoleptus rotundatus (LeConte, 1863)
 Agonoleptus rotundicollis (Haldeman, 1843)
 Agonoleptus thoracicus (Casey, 1914)
 Agonoleptus unicolor (Dejean, 1829)

References

Further reading

 

Harpalinae
Articles created by Qbugbot